Bogdan Argeș Vintilă (born 27 February 1972) is a Romanian former professional footballer.

Managerial statistics

References

External links
 
 
 
 

1972 births
Living people
Romanian footballers
Liga I players
Liga II players
Faur București players
FC Argeș Pitești players
FC Rapid București players
FC Progresul București players
Bursaspor footballers
CS Concordia Chiajna players
Expatriate footballers in Turkey
Romanian expatriate sportspeople in Turkey
Süper Lig players
Romanian football managers
CS Concordia Chiajna managers
FC Viitorul Constanţa managers
FC Voluntari managers
FC Metaloglobus București managers
FC Steaua București managers
Association football goalkeepers
Romania international footballers